XEBS-AM is a radio station on 1410 AM in Mexico City. XEBS-AM is owned by NRM Comunicaciones and broadcasts Música Tropical music under the name Sabrosita

History

XEBS-AM is among Mexico City's most stable radio stations, maintaining the same callsign, frequency and concessionaire throughout its history. It signed on in 1937 as "Vocero Hispano-Mexicano" but did not receive its first concession until 1943. In 1953, with the goal of offering rural music to a rapidly expanding Mexico City area, the station took on the name "Radio Sinfonola" — which it would continue with for the next 51 years, until becoming grupera-formatted "La Más Perrona" in 2004. The station had begun airing a daily hour-long program with music by Pedro Infante in 1952, which lasted for 61 uninterrupted years, being controversially cancelled in January 2013. The cancellation of the Pedro Infante program resulted in a loss of audience and the resignation of longtime host and director Gustavo Alvite.

In August 2017, the La Más Perrona name was jettisoned as part of a relaunch of the station, with a new name, Bandolera, being instituted.

XEBS-FM, started in 1961, originally broadcast on 89.7 FM but was moved to 100.9 FM. That station, still owned by NRM, is now XHSON-FM "Beat 100.9".

On December 1, 2022 Bandolera stopped broadcasting on 1410 kHz, and NRM began simulcasting the Sabrosita programming of XEPH-AM 590 on the frequency.

External links

References

1937 establishments in Mexico
Radio stations established in 1937
Radio stations in Mexico City
Regional Mexican radio stations
Spanish-language radio stations